The SAFF U-15/U-16/U-17 Championship is an annual international football competition contested by the national teams of the members of the South Asian Football Federation (SAFF). The first edition was held as SAFF U-16 Championship, where most teams sent their U-15 team, keeping in mind AFC U-16 Championship hold every following years to SAFF U-16 Championship. In the 2017 edition, it was held as SAFF U-15 Championship and the subsequent 2022 edition, the SAFF U-17 Championship was introduced. The first edition of the tournament took place in Nepal in August 2011. The competition was launched under the leadership of SAFF President Kazi Salahuddin who was elected in 2009.

Results

U17 format

U16 format

U15 format

Teams

Participating nations

Legend

 – Champions
 – Runners-up
 – Third place
 – Fourth place
 – Semifinals
GS – Group stage
q – Qualified for upcoming tournament
 — Hosts
 ×  – Did not enter
 •  – Did not qualify
 ×  – Withdrew before qualification
 — Withdrew/Disqualified after qualification
 — Not part of SAFF

Awards

See also
 SAFF Championship
 SAFF U-20 Championship

References

 
SAFF competitions
Under-15 association football
Recurring sporting events established in 2011
2011 establishments in Asia